William Lambert Young  (13 November 1913 – 14 July 2009) was a New Zealand politician representing the National Party.

Biography

Early life and career
Young was born in Kawakawa in 1913, the son of James Young. He attended Ngawha Native School,  from Kawakawa, where his parents were teachers, and then Wellington College. After his education he worked for stock and station agents Murray Roberts Company Limited.

From 1941 to 1943 he served in World War II with the 2nd New Zealand Division in North Africa, and was invalided home after the workshop section in Egypt was bombed.

He then resumed work at Murray Roberts Company Limited until 1946, then music retailer Beggs (1946–1956), and was general manager of manufacturer/retailer Radio Corporation of New Zealand (1956–1966). Young was active with the New Zealand Automobile Association and was vice-president of the Wellington AA, and a member of the council of the North Island AA. He was a member of the Wellington Chamber of Commerce and a director of several companies.

Political career

By the 1960 he was an active member of the National Party and was on the executive of the  electorate committee. He was later chairman of the party's Wellington Division and a member of the party Dominion Council from 1964 to 1966. He had long been interested in politics and noted for his debating and public speaking ability. He was approached to stand for Mayor of Wellington ahead of the 1962 election, but after giving consideration to doing so, he declined to stand.

Instead he set his sights on national politics and in  he stood for National for the  electorate against Bill Fox, a former Labour Party cabinet minister. While reducing Fox's majority he was unsuccessful.

In opposition from 1974 to 1975 he was National's spokesman for roading and women's rights.

From 1975 to 1981 he served in the Third National Government as Minister of Works. His portfolio allocation was owed to his lifetime interest in construction and knowledge of hydro-electric power development. He was also a strong advocate for the completion of the Wellington Urban Motorway and up until his death he continued to advocate the benefits of a second Mount Victoria Tunnel.

Wellington newspaper The Evening Post editorialised at the time that the appointment was "out- of-the-blue" but popular and he became known as capable and affable in the role. At the time New Zealand was regarded well in London due to lending its support in the Falklands War. His main focus was assisting New Zealand trade emissaries as they argued for continued access to British markets for agricultural products following a European Commission proposal to slash the butter quota.

Later life and death
He was the president of the Star Boating Club and also a patron of the Company of Musical Players. He was a member of the Tararua Tramping Club and New Zealand Amateur Rowing Association.

In the 1992 New Year Honours, he was made a Companion of the Order of St Michael and St George, for public services.

He died in Wellington in 2009.

Personal life and family
Young married Isobel Joan Luke, the daughter of George Luke, in 1946. His wife Joan came from a prominent Wellington political family – her grandfather (Sir John Luke) and great uncle (Sir Charles Luke) had both been local parliamentarians and Wellington mayors. They had five children together: James, Christine, Rosemary, Nicola and Annabel.

Rosemary Young (later Young-Rouse after marrying Michael Rouse) was a member of the Wellington City Council from 1974 to 1987 when she resigned mid-term after relocating to Auckland. She later re-married to National cabinet minister Max Bradford.

Annabel Young was a list Member of Parliament for the National Party from 1997 until 2002.

Notes

References

1913 births
2009 deaths
New Zealand Companions of the Order of St Michael and St George
People educated at Wellington College (New Zealand)
Members of the Cabinet of New Zealand
New Zealand military personnel of World War II
New Zealand National Party MPs
High Commissioners of New Zealand to the United Kingdom
Ambassadors of New Zealand to Ireland
High Commissioners of New Zealand to Nigeria
People from Kawakawa, New Zealand
New Zealand MPs for Wellington electorates
Unsuccessful candidates in the 1981 New Zealand general election
Unsuccessful candidates in the 1963 New Zealand general election
Members of the New Zealand House of Representatives